Bruce Makkink is a South African international lawn bowler.

Bowls career
He won a silver medal in the fours at the 2000 World Outdoor Bowls Championship in Johannesburg.

He also won a bronze medal in the fours at the 1998 Commonwealth Games in Kuala Lumpur.

He won three titles at the National Championships bowling for the R.D.L.I Sport Club. They were the 2010 & 2011 singles and 2011 fours.

References

Living people
South African male bowls players
Commonwealth Games medallists in lawn bowls
Commonwealth Games bronze medallists for South Africa
Year of birth missing (living people)
Bowls players at the 1998 Commonwealth Games
Medallists at the 1998 Commonwealth Games